Durvillaea potatorum is a large, robust species of southern bull kelp found in Australia.

Description
The species can be confused with Durvillaea amatheiae, which has an overlapping geographic distribution. D. potatorum has a shorter, wider stipe with more limited lateral blade development, whereas D. amatheiae has a shorter, narrow stipe and typically prolific lateral blade development.

Distribution
Durvillaea potatorum is endemic to southeast Australia.

Uses
Durvillaea potatorum was used extensively for clothing and tools by Aboriginal Tasmanians, with uses including material for shoes and bags to transport freshwater and food. Currently, D. potatorum is collected as beach wrack from King Island, where it is then dried as chips and sent to Scotland for phycocolloid extraction.

References

External links
AlgaeBase: Durvillaea potatorum (Labillardière) Areschoug

Fucales
Flora of Australia
Edible seaweeds